Tall Friend is an American indie pop band from Philadelphia, Pennsylvania.

History
Tall Friend released their first EP in 2016 titles Tawl Friend. In 2017, Tall Friend follows up with the release of their debut full-length album titled Safely Nobody's on Exploding in Sound.

Tall Friend's song Apoptosis was listed at number 8 in Rolling Stone critic Rob Sheffield’s list of the top 25 songs of 2017.

Discography

Studio albums
Safely Nobody's (2018, Exploding In Sound)

EPs
Tawl Friend (2017, self-released)

References

American indie pop groups
Musical groups from Philadelphia